Willemina Zwanida "Willeke" Wendrich (born 13 September 1961, Haarlem) is a Dutch and/or American Egyptologist and archaeologist.

Wendrich completed her Ph.D. at the Centre for Asian, African and Amerindian Studies (CNWS]) at Leiden University in the Netherlands in 1993. The topic of her dissertation was Ethnoarchaeology and the social context of Ancient Egyptian basketry, which was subsequently published as The World According to Basketry by the CIoA Press in June 1999. From 1995 to 1999 Wendrich was an assistant professor of Egyptian archaeology at Leiden University, stationed at the  Netherlands Institute for Archaeology and Arabic Studies in Cairo. In 2000, Wendrich moved to Los Angeles and became an assistant professor in the Department of Near Eastern Languages and Cultures at the University of California, Los Angeles (UCLA). Currently Wendrich holds the Joan Silsbee Chair in African Cultural Archaeology after becoming promoted to full professor in 2009.

Wendrich has participated in projects at Çatal Höyük, Amarna, and Elephantine, and directed excavations of her own. From 1994 to 2002, she was co-director of excavations at the Roman port city of Berenike on the Egyptian Red Sea coast with Prof.  Sidebotham from the University of Delaware. Since 2003 Wendrich has been working in the Fayum region of Egypt on the North shore of Lake Qarun in cooperation with René Cappers of the Rijksuniversiteit Groningen and  Simon Holdaway of the University of Auckland on the URU. The Fayum Project URU includes excavation work on both a variety of Neolithic and Graeco-Roman period sites, including Karanis (Kom Aushim). Work on the Neolithic materials resulted in the discovery of the evidence for farming in Egypt at the site Kom K. Wendrich has been involved in archaeological education as the chairperson of the board of directors at the Institute for Field Research.

In addition to her field research, Wendrich has been involved in a number of digital humanities initiatives at UCLA. She is editor-in-chief of the  UCLA Encyclopedia of Egyptology, a collaborative project aimed at providing accurate, open-source articles on a wide range of Egyptological topics. In collaboration with members of the Deutsches Archäologisches Institut, Kairo, Wendrich developed the  Aegeron (Ancient Egyptian Architecture Online) project. Wendrich has also been the director of the  Center for Digital Humanities at UCLA since 2013.

External links
Faculty page

1961 births
Living people
American Egyptologists
Dutch Egyptologists
Dutch emigrants to the United States 
Leiden University alumni
Academic staff of Leiden University
People from Haarlem
University of California, Los Angeles faculty
American women archaeologists
American women historians
21st-century American women